Healey is a small village and civil parish in the Harrogate district of North Yorkshire, England. It is situated in the valley of the River Burn, to the immediate west of Fearby. It is about three miles west of Masham in the Nidderdale Area of Outstanding Natural Beauty. There are several holiday cottages and four Grade II Listed buildings, one of which is Healey Mill, a former corn mill.

The civil parish includes Leighton Reservoir, the hamlet of Leighton, the hamlet of Gollinglith Foot in the lower part of Colsterdale and a large area of Masham Moor, a grouse moor, rising to the summit of Great Haw,  from the village at the western extremity of the parish.  The population of the parish was estimated at 100 in 2013.

History 
Healey was historically a township in the large ancient parish of Masham in the wapentake of Hang East in the North Riding of Yorkshire. Healey became a separate ecclesiastical parish in 1849. The civil parish of Healey with Sutton was formed in 1866. In 1934  of the uninhabited Masham Moor (which had been common to the parishes of Masham and East Witton) were added to the civil parish, which was then renamed Healey.

Governance 
Until 1974 Healey was part of Masham Rural District (before 1934 Masham Urban District) in the North Riding of Yorkshire.  It is now part of the Borough of Harrogate in North Yorkshire.

The parish now shares a grouped parish council, known as Fearby, Healey and District Parish Council, with Colsterdale, Fearby, Ellingstring and Ilton cum Pott.

Church 

The church, dedicated to St Paul, is a Grade II* Listed building completed in 1848. It was designed in the decorative style by the Victorian architect Edward Buckton Lamb and has a central tower with a spire. The stained glass east window was donated by Sir Robert Frankland-Russell. The north window was commissioned by Lamb and bears his initials. The west window may also be to his design.

School 
Kell Bank Church of England Primary School, midway between Healey and the neighbouring village of Fearby, serves both villages.  It was founded in 1822 by William Heslington and William Danby. In 1890 it had an attendance of 60, but by February 2021 the school roll had fallen to only 6 pupils and plans were announced to close it.

References

External links 
St Paul's Healey

Civil parishes in North Yorkshire
Villages in North Yorkshire